Aleksandr Aleksandrovich Storozhuk (born 10 August 1981) is a Russian professional football coach and a former player. He is the manager of Arsenal Tula.

Club career
He played 6 seasons in the Russian Football National League for 5 different clubs.

References

1981 births
People from Vyselkovsky District
Sportspeople from Krasnodar Krai
Living people
Russian people of Ukrainian descent
Russian footballers
Association football defenders
FC Zhemchuzhina Sochi players
FC Lokomotiv Nizhny Novgorod players
FC SKA Rostov-on-Don players
FC Chernomorets Novorossiysk players
FC Metallurg Lipetsk players
FC Irtysh Omsk players
FC Gornyak Uchaly players
FC Mashuk-KMV Pyatigorsk players
Russian First League players
Russian Second League players
Russian football managers
FC Krasnodar managers
FC Arsenal Tula managers
Russian Premier League managers